Bolbocephalodidae is a family of flatworms belonging to the order Strigeidida. The family consists of only one genus: Bolbocephalodes Strand, 1935.

References

Platyhelminthes